Ravage 2099 (Paul-Phillip Ravage) is a fictional character, a superhero appearing in American comic books published by Marvel Comics.

Publication history

Ravage was created by writer Stan Lee and penciler Paul Ryan in 1992 for Marvel Comics' Marvel 2099 imprint. Ravage’s first full appearance was in Ravage 2099 #1, which was released alongside other Marvel 2099 universe titles Spider-Man 2099, Doom 2099, and Punisher 2099.  Unlike the other titles, Ravage was original, not a re-imagined version of an existing character. The series ran for 33 issues cover-dated December 1992 to August 1995.

Ryan said artist John Byrne had originally been on Ravage 2099 but that, “Apparently there were creative differences. It didn’t work out. John walked away … I was pretty good friends with Tom DeFalco, who was the Editor-in-Chief at the time," and so Ryan offered to lend a hand if needed. "I wasn’t looking for another series because I was working on two at the time. Couple of days later, Tom calls me and says how would you like to do Ravage 2099? … I said why don’t you check with Stan first to make sure its ok if I pencil the series … and Stan said, Why not?"
 
Ryan designed the character, doing “three or four incarnations” that kept getting rejected by Lee and editor Joey Cavalieri. “And I was getting very frustrated because this is for free basically when you are developing the character. So my wife Linda says Why don’t you just call Stan? Find out what he wants firsthand." Ryan did so, and with Lee doing “most of the talking, I just listened and was sketching out what he was describing. So then I faxed it over to him. He had several minor tweaks to it, but he said this is what I want. I said great.”

Lee wrote through issue #8 (July 1993), which he plotted only, leaving the script to writers Pat Mills and Tony Skinner, who then fully wrote the series from #9-32 (August 1993 - July 1995), with Ian Edgington writing the finale. Lee said in an interview that he had wanted Marvel "to create a new line of superheroes. I said, ‘What if we did our characters 100 years from now?’” He said Ravage 2099 was “different from anything I've done before. I'm taking my time with the story. He doesn’t even get his superpowers until the end of the fourth issue.”
 
Grant Miehm became the regular penciler with issue #8, then Joe Bennett from #22-31 (September 1994 - June 1995). José Delbo filled-in on #9, and Marcos Tetelli penciled the last two issues.

Lee’s Spider-Man co-creator, Steve Ditko had originally been considered as penciler after Byrne left, according to Marvel Editor-in-Chief Tom DeFalco:

Fictional character biography
Paul-Phillip Ravage was the chief executive officer of ECO Central, a subsidiary of the Alchemax mega-corporation, that worked to combat polluters. Ravage's life changed when he was framed for murder in response to questioning the secrets of the company and the violent, often fatal, methods it used. Becoming a fugitive and armed with a blaster, a cog used as a shuriken, and a Kevlar vest, Ravage was the target of both the police and Alchemax executive Anderthorp Henton. His companions while on the run were the orphan Dack, the son of a man his company killed, and Tiana Sikoski, an Asian-American woman who had been his secretary. Ravage's baptism of fire came when he battled a mutroid (one of the human convicts mutated by the radiation and biohazards of the prison island Hellrock), ECO security and Alchemax troops as found himself traveling from civilization to Hellrock. There he became the mutated hero of the Decred Barrio, an impoverished community of superhero worshipers located on the outskirts of the city. Ravage freed Tiana from the despotic ruler of Hellrock, Lord Dethstryk, who planned to invade the rest of the world and destroy all humans. He would become Ravage's primary nemesis.

On Hellrock, where genetic scientist Dr. Ursell began helping him, Ravage was mutated by prolonged exposure to the island's radiation and biohazards, and for a short time his hands generated lethal energy. Eventually, his body devolved to a primal beast form, making Ravage far more attuned to the animal world than the human, and giving him horn-like protuberances on his head and face; talons on his hands and feet; fangs; a long vertical scar on the left side of his face; enhanced senses, strength, and speed; and the ability to regenerate from almost any wound. Ravage soon found he could also transform back to human form when necessary. He escaped Hellrock using a rebuilt Fantasticar, formerly that of the 20th-century heroes the Fantastic Four, and eventually reconnected with his estranged family. He succeeds his assassinated brother, Jean-Claude Ravage, as head of the mega-corporation Green Globe. Tiana meanwhile became a version of the Norse entity Hel, given powers by Alchemax as part of a scheme to control or kill vigilante superheroes such as Ravage.

Alongside Dack and Tiana, he battled the New Atlanteans, and then Anderthorp Henton. His body was then reverted to bestial form by radiation.

Ravage attempted to control his animal side, with mixed results, and comes to accept it. He encountered 2099's Punisher, X-Men, Spider-Man and Doctor Doom. He eventually returned to Hellrock, along with Tiana/Hela and the sentient bat-creature Ferra. There, with the help of Dethstryk's confidant, the Seeress, Ravage killed Dethstryk and took over Hellrock. Ravage presumably died after Doom immersed him and the rest of the island in liquid adamantium, with Doom then launching the island into space.

Powers, abilities, and equipment
Ravage gained powers through surgery and being mutated by the radiation of Hellrock, where he battled Deathstryk to free Tiana. Initially, they consisted of the ability to project bio-kinetic energy beams from his hands that were physically taxing on Ravage's toll. However, these genetic alterations have changed him even further and then, he became a man-beast. In his new form, he has enhanced strength, stamina, durability, speed, agility, reflexes, healing, and senses, as well as natural horns, fangs, and claws.

He formerly wore a vest of unknown 21st century fabric lined with "ultimate" Kevlar (an experimental laser-proof material), molecular gloves (to contain the kinetic energies stored up in his hands for one hour), and adjustable opti-lens (that enables long-range telescopic and infra-red sight).

Collected editions

References

External links
Ravage 2099 at Marvel.com

1992 comics debuts
Characters created by Stan Lee
Defunct American comics
Fictional businesspeople
Fictional characters with superhuman durability or invulnerability
Fictional characters with superhuman senses
Marvel 2099 characters
Marvel 2099 titles
Marvel Comics characters who can move at superhuman speeds
Marvel Comics characters with accelerated healing
Marvel Comics characters with superhuman strength
Marvel Comics mutates
Vigilante characters in comics